Thomas Edgar (born 21 June 1989) is an Australian volleyball player. He competed for Australia at the 2012 Summer Olympics.

Career
He began his career in Queensland. In the 2011–2012 season he played for the Italian Serie A2 club, Volley Corigliano. In the following season, Edgar transferred to Serie A1 club Sir Safety Perugia. In 2013 he moved to South Korea to play for LIG Insurance Greaters. In 2015 he played in the Chinese Volleyball League for Beijing. Thomas has been the captain of the team since 2015.

On 12 August 2022, he signed a one-year contract with Galatasaray, one of the Turkish Men's Volleyball League teams.

Sporting achievements
 2019 Asian Men's Volleyball Championship – Most Valuable Player

Record
We emphasize that Edgar's record relates only to games under the patronage of the International Volleyball Federation. There are players that scored more points in other competitions. The match Australia – Egypt will also be remembered by another record the highest number of points collected by rival opposites Edgar's 50 points.

References

1989 births
Living people
Australian men's volleyball players
Volleyball players at the 2012 Summer Olympics
Olympic volleyball players of Australia
Trefl Gdańsk players
Sportspeople from Bundaberg
Galatasaray S.K. (men's volleyball) players